The Teodoro Moscoso Bridge is a bridge in Puerto Rico. It works as an extension of PR-17, also known as the Jesus T. Piñero Expressway, connecting this road with the Román Baldorioty de Castro Expressway (PR-26). It crosses the San José Lagoon thereby linking sectors of Rio Piedras in San Juan to Isla Verde Carolina neighbor. The bridge has become the new entrance to the Luis Muñoz Marín International Airport. It was opened on February 28, 1994 under the administration of Governor Pedro Rosselló, this construction being the first to be held under a Public Private Partnership in Puerto Rico. The bridge consists of four lanes, electronic signs, a toll plaza with a fee of $3.65 in each direction,. The bridge has flagpoles on both sides with alternating American and Puerto Rican flags, as of July 2019. The bridge accepts AutoExpreso, Puerto Rico's toll transponder system.

Toll Plaza

Etymology
The bridge is named after Teodoro Moscoso, known as "the architect of Operation Bootstrap", a plan of economic expansion after World War II.

History
On the bridge is held one of the largest 10K races in the world; The World's Best 10K attracts thousands of local and international competitors each year. As of April 2016, the standard toll is $3.65 collected on the South Shore for southbound and northbound traffic, making it the most expensive toll fare in Puerto Rico. It is the first project of privatization of road on the island and across the United States. It measures  in length. It serves as the main entrance to Luis Munoz Marin International Airport. It connects the airport with the upscale Mall of San Juan (open since March 2015). It is one of the longest bridges in Puerto Rico. It was built with an investment of $126.8 million.

Gallery

See also
 List of bridges in the United States
 List of bridges by length
 Farmacias Moscoso

References

Bridges completed in 1994
Buildings and structures in San Juan, Puerto Rico
Carolina, Puerto Rico
Public–private partnerships in Puerto Rico
1994 establishments in Puerto Rico
Toll bridges in Puerto Rico
Transportation in San Juan, Puerto Rico